An intention is a mental state committing to a course of action.

Intention may also refer to:
Intention (book), a 1957 monograph by philosopher G. E. M. Anscombe
Intention (criminal law), a state of mind accompanying certain crimes
Intention in English law
Intention (film), a 2018 Korean documentary on the sinking of MV Sewol
"Intention" (Intelligent Music Project song), Bulgaria's entry in the Eurovision Song Contest 2022
"Intention" (Kenichi Suzumura song), a 2008 single
Intention Nunataks, a group of peaks in Antarctica

See also
Intent (disambiguation)
Intentions (disambiguation)
Intentional Theatre, a community theater in Waterford, Connecticut